Marie-Christine Bernard (born 1966) is a Canadian educator and award-winning writer living in Quebec.

She was born in Carleton-sur-Mer and received a bachelor's degree and then a master's degree in literary studies from the Université Laval. Bernard has taught at the Collège d'Alma since 1994; she teaches literature, creative writing, film analysis and ethnology. From 2006 to 2010, she hosted the program "Beau temps, mauvais temps" on Ici Radio-Canada Première Saguenay. She also contributes to a number of literary journals, including Zone occupée and to the webzine Mauvaise Herbe.

In 2016, she represented Quebec at the Semaine de la langue française et de la Francophonie, held in Mexico.

Selected works 
 Monsieur Julot (2005), novel, received the Prix découverte Abitibi-Consolidated
 La confiture de rêves (2007), youth novel, received the 
 Le prince Malavenant (2008), youth novel
 Mademoiselle Personne (2008), novel, received the Prix France-Québec ant the Prix du roman Abitibi-Bowater
 Sombre peuple (2010), short stories

References 

1966 births
Living people
Canadian women novelists
Canadian women short story writers
Université Laval alumni